Neptis puella, the little sailer, is a butterfly in the family Nymphalidae. It is found in Sierra Leone, Ivory Coast, Ghana, Togo, Nigeria, Cameroon, the Democratic Republic of Congo, Uganda, western Kenya, western Tanzania and north-western Zambia. The habitat consists of Cryptosepalum woodland.

References

Butterflies described in 1894
puella
Butterflies of Africa